The propaganda of the Russian Federation  promotes views, perceptions or agendas of the government of Russia. The media include state-run outlets and online technologies, and may involve using "Soviet-style 'active measures' as an element of modern Russian 'political warfare. Notably, contemporary Russian propaganda  promotes the cult of personality of Vladimir Putin and positive views of Soviet history. Russia has established a number of organizations, such as the Presidential Commission of the Russian Federation to Counter Attempts to Falsify History to the Detriment of Russia's Interests, the Russian web brigades, and others that engage in political propaganda to promote the views of the Russian government.

State-sponsored global PR effort
At the end of 2008, Lev Gudkov, based on the Levada Center polling data, pointed out the near-disappearance of public opinion as a socio-political institution in contemporary Russia and its replacement with the state propaganda.

Shortly after the Beslan school hostage crisis in September 2004, Putin enhanced a Kremlin-sponsored program aimed at "improving Russia's image" abroad. One of the major projects of the program was the creation in 2005 of Russia Today (now known as RT), an English language TV news channel providing 24-hour news coverage. Towards its start-up budget, $30 million of public funds were allocated. A CBS News story on the launch of Russia Today quoted Boris Kagarlitsky as saying it was "very much a continuation of the old Soviet propaganda services".

Russia's deputy foreign minister Grigory Karasin said in August 2008, in the context of the Russia–Georgia conflict: "Western media is a well-organized machine, which is showing only those pictures that fit in well with their thoughts. We find it very difficult to squeeze our opinion into the pages of their newspapers." In June 2007, Vedomosti reported that the Kremlin had been intensifying its official lobbying activities in the United States since 2003, among other things hiring such companies as Hannaford Enterprises and Ketchum.

In a 2005 interview with U.S government-owned external broadcaster Voice of America, the Russian-Israeli blogger Anton Nossik said the creation of RT "smacks of Soviet-style propaganda campaigns." Pascal Bonnamour, the head of the European department of Reporters Without Borders, called the newly announced network "another step of the state to control information." In 2009, Luke Harding (then the Moscow correspondent) of The Guardian described RT's advertising campaign in the United Kingdom as an "ambitious attempt to create a new post-Soviet global propaganda empire." According to Lev Gudkov, the director of the Levada Center, Russia's most well respected polling organization. Putin's Russia's propaganda is "aggressive and deceptive ... worse than anything I witnessed in the Soviet Union"

In 2014, Ivan Zassoursky, a professor of Media and Theory of Communications in the Journalism Department of Moscow State University, said that: "Today there are many complex schemes of influence in the world that can be labeled as soft power. But traditional thuggish methods of propaganda and direct control used by the Russian government cannot be considered effective from the professional standpoint and acceptable from the viewpoint of journalist morality."

Following Russia's 2014 annexation of Crimea, a significant increase in Russian propaganda was noted by NATO. In February 2017, a fabricated audio recording of NATO Secretary Jens Stoltenberg supposedly interacting with Ukrainian President Petro Poroshenko was published by Russian news website Life.ru. The supposed voice of Poroshenko was revealed to be Russian pranksters. Russia has been comparing Ukrainian Nationalist fighters in Donbass to members of ISIS. Political scholar Nikolay Kozhanov has claimed that Russia has used propaganda to convey nationalistic as well as pro-Assad messages during the Syrian Civil War. Kozhanov claims that Russia has made an effort through propaganda to paint Russia and Syria as a stable force "in the struggle against instability caused by the Americans and terrorism supported by the US regional partners."

RT and Sputnik news agency are also spreading false information. In the downing of Malaysia Airlines Flight 17, the Bellingcat website of Eliot Higgins gave evidence about the manipulation of satellite images released by the Russian Ministry of Defense which was used by RT and Sputnik news agency based in Edinburgh, Scotland.

Continuing Russian propaganda led to several people experiencing the denial of their experience of the Russian invasion of Ukraine in 2022, even by family members from the other side of the information iron curtain. Russian state-controlled media systematically downplayed both civilian and military losses, denouncing reports of attacks on civilians as "fake" or blaming Ukrainian forces. Although the 1993 Russian Constitution has an article expressly prohibiting censorship, the Russian censorship apparatus Roskomnadzor ordered the country's media to only employ information from Russian state sources or face fines and blocks, accusing a number of independent media outlets of spreading "unreliable socially significant untrue information" about the shelling of Ukrainian cities by the Russian army and civilian deaths. Dmitry Muratov, the editor-in-chief of the Russian independent newspaper Novaya Gazeta, said that "Everything that's not propaganda is being eliminated."

According to researchers, Russia has intensified international propaganda-efforts targeting Africa, the Middle East and Asia. Increases in Arabic-language pro-Russian propaganda was detected during the Russian invasion of Ukraine, Russia has been accused of amplifying anti-Western post-colonial grievances in Africa through disinformation campaigns. Partly due to Russian efforts, pro-Moscow sentiments and blaming the West for the 2022 Russian invasion of Ukraine has become mainstream in much of Africa.

Notable Russian propagandists 

 Dmitry Kiselyov, TV host and Rossiya Segodnya news agency General Director (under sanctions imposed by Australia) 
 Margarita Simonyan, editor-in-chief of RT (formerly Russia Today)  and Rossiya Segodnya
 Mikhail Leontyev, Channel One host (under sanctions imposed by Australia) 
 Vladimir Solovyov, anchor on the television show Evening with Vladimir Solovyov on Russia-1 (The United Kingdom and the European Union sanctioned Solovyov for inciting violence and undermining Ukraine's sovereignty) 
 Oleg Gazmanov, Russian singer and propagandist
 Olga Skabeyeva, television presenter on All-Russia State Television and Radio Broadcasting Company
 Yevgeny Popov, television presenter on All-Russia State Television and Radio Broadcasting Company
 Dmitry Steshin, war correspondent for the "Komsomolskaya Pravda" tabloid newspaper (under sanctions imposed by UK and Australia) 
 Alexander Kots, war correspondent for the "Komsomolskaya Pravda" tabloid newspaper (under sanctions imposed by UK and Australia) 
 Evgeniy Poddubny, special correspondent for Russia-24 and Russia-1 television channels (under sanctions imposed by UK and Australia) 
 Alexander Sladkov, special correspondent for the Izvestia program
 Semen Pegov, military project WarGonzo author
 Ramzan Kadyrov, head of the Chechen Republic.

Use of social media

Russia has been accused of using social media platforms to spread messages of propaganda to a global audience by spreading fake news as well as putting out advertisements and creating pseudo-activist movements. The popularity of Sputnik on social media and its use of viral, clickbait headlines has led it to be described as "the BuzzFeed of Propaganda" by Foreign Policy magazine.

Russia was accused by the US authorities for efforts to spread fake news and propaganda in an attempt to meddle in the 2016 US presidential election. Russia is alleged to have used tactics such as creating fraudulent social media accounts, organization of political rallies and online political advertisements in an effort to help Republican presidential nominee Donald Trump win the election. Senior executives of American social media platforms made an effort to counter alleged Russian propaganda by deleting automated accounts and alerting users of the presence of alleged misinformation on their platforms and interactions users may have had. In January 2017, Twitter estimated that approximately 677,000 users had "interacted with Russian propaganda or bots during the 2016 campaign." Three weeks later Twitter officials said that it is likely more than 1.4 million users were exposed to content stemming from these accounts. In 2018, Twitter deleted approximately 200,000 tweets that were found to have stemmed from accounts linked to Russia. On October 31, 2017, executives from Facebook, Google and Twitter testified on Russia's alleged use of social media in the 2016 election, before the House Intelligence Committee. In an effort to combat fake news, Facebook announced a plan in January 2018 to attempt to highlight reliable sources of news.

On May 17, 2017, Deputy Attorney General Rod Rosenstein appointed former FBI Director Robert Mueller to serve as special counsel to the US Justice Department in an investigation into alleged Russian interference in the 2016 election. On February 16, 2018, The US Justice Department indicted thirteen Russian nationals and three Russian companies on charges of attempting to influence the 2016 election in support of the Trump Campaign. Among the organizations indicted was the Internet Research Agency, a St. Petersburg based company that is said to use social media to spread fake news promoting Russian interests. The indictment claims that employees of the IRA were urged to "use any opportunity to criticize Hillary [Clinton]".

Russia has been accused of engaging in propaganda campaigns in an effort to sway public opinion concerning the nation's annexation of Crimea in 2014. Russian social media operations were allegedly undertaken to use misinformation to appeal to pro-Russian forces in Crimea, while discrediting rebel and separatist groups. Notably, a false story was spread throughout social media of a young child being crucified by Ukrainian nationalist troops in Slovyansk. The Ukrainian government also banned several Russian internet services, including the popular social media network, Vkontakte, which has been criticized as being censorship, affecting millions of Ukrainians.

Propaganda in education 
Since coming to power in 2000, Putin and his government promoted the idea of "patriotic education" in educational reforms in order to spread propaganda and increase the loyalty to the regime. Putin has insisted that students learn patriotic values in schools, that lessons in history, languages and the arts should inspire pride among youth and strengthen their "patriotism". At first, these efforts to bring about educational changes had limited success, however, after the Annexation of Crimea in 2014, according to The Washington Post, the "patriotic" reforms and the emphasis on patriotism has grown, while freedom of speech in schools declined, and teachers also became more likely to be fired for publicly expressing political views. The national Russian symbols became more celebrated, and in 2014, the Russian government approved a new set of history textbooks, which featured a revised narrative of historical events and praised Putin's achievements and the annexation of Crimea.

The most sacred part of Putin's model of "patriotic" education is reverence for the so-called "Great Patriotic War" (Eastern front of World War II in 1941–1945), Soviet victory in which is sanitized and glorified to the point of turning it into a national ideology. The phenomenon is known as pobedobesie.

After the Russian invasion of Ukraine in February 2022, Russian authorities have passed new education laws, revised school textbooks and introduced teaching guides that help teachers deliver "patriotic" lessons which would justify the invasion. In the first week of March, Russian schools held an "All-Russia open lesson", instructions to which on how teachers should present the invasion and address students' questions were distributed by the Ministry of Education. Russian teachers faced prosecution for expressing anti-war views in and outside the classroom, and the government introduced legislation to keep vaguely defined "foreign agents and influence" out of schools. In Summer of 2022, Putin approved the creation of nationwide children's and youth movement modeled after the Soviet pioneer organisations, and in August, the Ministry of Education launched a new lesson, "" (also translated as "Important conversations" and "Conversations about important things"), which will teach "patriotism" and that "a true patriot should be ready to defend the country" and "to die for the Motherland".

Reactions
Due to the propaganda in the Russian Federation, the European External Action Service founded the East StratCom Task Force in 2015 to count and display cases of untruths propagated in Russia about the EU and its member states.

According to Mykola Riabchuk, Ukrainian journalist and political analyst, the Russian propaganda evolved into a full-fledged information war during the Russo-Ukrainian War. Riabchuk writes: "Three major narratives emerged that can be summed up as 'Ukraine's borders are artificial', 'Ukraine's  society is deeply divided', and 'Ukrainian institutions are irreparably dysfunctional'," thus needing "external, apparently Russian, guardianship."

During a hearing in the US Congress in 2015, Leon Aron, director of Russian studies at the American Enterprise Institute, described the Russian-sponsored TV network RT (formerly known as Russia Today) as not only promoting the Russian "brand", but aiming to "devalue the ideas of democratic transparency and responsibility, undermine the belief in the reliability of public information and fill the airwaves with half-truths". He described Russian state propaganda as "aggressive, often subtle, and effective in its use of the Internet".

Peter Pomerantsev, a British TV producer, in his 2014 book Nothing Is True and Everything Is Possible, argues that the propaganda's goals are not to convince, as in the classical propaganda, but to make an information field "dirty" so people would trust nobody.

Discussing the Russo-Ukrainian War in 2014, John Kerry, United States Secretary of State, referred to RT as a state-sponsored "propaganda bullhorn" and continued, " network has deployed to promote president Putin's fantasy about what is playing out on the ground. They almost spend full-time devoted to this effort, to propagandize, and to distort what is happening or not happening in Ukraine." Cliff Kincaid, the director of Accuracy in Media's Center for Investigative Journalism, called RT "the well-known disinformation outlet for Russian propaganda".

Members of European parliament have argued that Europe needs to strengthen its defense against Russian propaganda citing alleged Russian meddling in French, German and Spanish elections as well as Brexit. In March 2015, The East Stratcom Task Force was created with the backing of the European Union in order to counter Russian efforts to spread misinformation and fake news.

On 14 March 2022, Marina Ovsyannikova, an editor for Russia's main state-controlled TV station Channel One, interrupted the television's live broadcast to protest against the Russian invasion of Ukraine, carrying a poster stating in a mix of Russian and English: "Stop the war, don't believe the propaganda, here you are being lied to."

On 5 April 2022, Russia's opposition politician Alexei Navalny said the "monstrosity of lies" in the Russian state media "is unimaginable. And, unfortunately, so is its persuasiveness for those who have no access to alternative information." He tweeted that "warmongers" among Russian state media personalities "should be treated as war criminals. From the editors-in-chief to the talk show hosts to the news editors, [they] should be sanctioned now and tried someday."

See also
Firehose of falsehood
Media freedom in Russia
Propaganda in the Soviet Union
Russophilia
Trolls from Olgino
Vatnik (slang)
American propaganda

References

External links
Общественное мнение против Путина ("Public opinion is anti-Putin"), article by Russian sociologist 

 
Russia
Politics of Russia
Anti-Americanism
Russo-Ukrainian War